James Hall Kinsella (July 12, 1924 – October 8, 2012) was an American attorney, politician, and jurist who served as the mayor of Hartford, Connecticut from 1957 to 1960.

Early life and education 
Kinsella was born to George F. Kinsella and Dorothea (née Mooney) Kinsella on July 12, 1924. His grandfather, Richard J. Kinsella, had previously served as Mayor of Hartford from 1918 to 1920 and from 1922 to 1924. His father, George F. Kinsella, had served as Hartford's city assessor. James Kinsella's brother, George B. Kinsella, later became Hartford's mayor for one term from 1965 to 1967.

Kinsella served in the United States Marine Corps, achieving the rank of sergeant, during World War II. He received a bachelor's degree from Trinity College in 1947 and a law degree from University of Nebraska College of Law in 1952. he returned to Hartford and passed the Connecticut state bar exam.

Career 
He practiced at a private law firm prior to entering local politics. In 1953, Kinsella was elected to the Hartford City Council when he was 29 years old. The city council also elected him Deputy Mayor, a position he held until he became Mayor of Hartford in 1957. Kinsella was elected mayor and sworn into office in 1957. He was re-elected to a second term in 1959 and served until late 1960.

Kinsella left the mayor's office in 1960 when he was elected a Hartford probate judge (Judge of Probate for the District of Hartford). He remained a probate judge in 1984. That same year, Kinsella retired from the bench as he was facing possible impeachment over the handling of the estate of a woman from neighboring West Hartford, Connecticut. He was never impeached.

Kinsella, who remained a working attorney until late in life, continued to pursue philanthropic endeavors for Hartford after leaving the court. He supported beautification efforts, including the construction of a city park and jogging track at Broad Street and Farmington Avenue in Hartford. He purchased police horses for the Hartford Police Department and lighting for Hartford City Hall. Kinsella also created scholarships, acquired a piano for the Hartford library, and installed a notable rose window at the Charter Oak Cultural Center.

Personal life 
Kinsella died at his home in Hartford on October 8, 2012, at the age of 88.

References

1924 births
2012 deaths
Mayors of Hartford, Connecticut
Connecticut city council members
Trinity College (Connecticut) alumni
United States Marine Corps personnel of World War II
Probate court judges in the United States
20th-century American judges
20th-century American lawyers
United States Marine Corps non-commissioned officers